Peron (sometimes spelled wrong as Pairon or Perron) is a village in Sardulgarh tehsil of Mansa district in Punjab, India. The village falls under the market committee of Talwandi Sabo (Bathinda district).

Geography 

Raipur, Bana Wala, Talwandi Aklia, Chhapian Wali, Behniwal, Singo are the surrounding villages. The village has a government primary school.

References 

Villages in Mansa district, India
Villages surrounding Talwandi Sabo Power Plant